Nottingham Rowing Club is a rowing club in West Bridgford, Nottingham. 

The club was formed in 2006 as a merger of the Nottingham Boat Club and the Nottingham Britannia Rowing Club, two historic rowing clubs that were established in 1894 and 1869 respectively. Since the merger of the two clubs, the NRC has incorporated the former Nottingham Schools Rowing Association and the Nottinghamshire County Rowing Association. Members from the two founder clubs have had success in national and international regattas, and represented the Great Britain team at World Championship and Olympic level. The Britannia Challenge Cup at Henley Royal Regatta is named after Nottingham Britannia Rowing Club, who donated the cup in 1969 to mark their centenary.

Successes by the club since its foundation include winning the Club Pennant at the 2008 Women's Eights Head of the River Race, while members of the new club have represented Great Britain at World Cup events and won elite finals at Women's Henley.

The current club has three boathouses situated on the River Trent in West Bridgford, as well as a presence at Holme Pierrepont. 

The Boat Club boathouse is also locally well known as a music venue.  Elton John, Rod Stewart, the Sex Pistols, Led Zeppelin and Black Sabbath all played at the venue, and Radio 1's John Peel broadcast from the club in 2002.

Honours

Recent British champions

Key
 J (junior), 2, 4, 8 (crew size), 18, 16, 15, 14 (age group), x (sculls), - (coxless), + (coxed)

Henley Royal Regatta

References

Rowing clubs in England
Sport in Nottinghamshire
Sport in Nottingham
Rowing clubs of the River Trent